The 2020–21 2. Bundesliga was the 47th season of the 2. Bundesliga. It began on 18 September 2020 and concluded on 23 May 2021. The season was originally scheduled to begin on 31 July 2020 and conclude on 16 May 2021, though this was delayed due to postponement of the previous season as a result of the COVID-19 pandemic. The relegation games were scheduled to be held between 26 and 30 May 2021. From 22 December 2020 to 1 January 2021, the season was interrupted by a shortened winter break. A total of 306 league and four relegation games were to be played, including three English weeks.

The fixtures were announced on 7 August 2020.

Effects of the COVID-19 pandemic
The season was originally scheduled to open on 31 July 2020 and end on 16 May 2021. As the pre-season operation was suspended for several weeks between 11 March and 16 May 2020 due to the COVID-19 pandemic, and the international club competitions of the same season did not end until August 2020, a postponement of the start of the season became necessary.
The DFB and the DFL, in consultation with FIFA, also adapted the summer transfer period (in principle 1 July to 31 August). The transfer window was open on 1 July (change period I.1) and from 15 July to 5 October 2020 (change period I.2). The first one-day phase was planned, in particular for the registration of contracts already concluded, starting on 1 July.

On 3 September 2020, the DFL General Assembly voted to extend the use of five substitutions in matches to the 2020–21 season, which was implemented at the end of the previous season to lessen the impact of fixture congestion caused by the COVID-19 pandemic. The use of five substitutes, based on the decision of competition organisers, had been extended by IFAB until 2021.

On 15 September 2020, three days before the opening of the new season, the premiers and representatives of the league agreed on a concept that would allow a spectator count of 20 percent of the stadium capacity by the end of October. In the end, 13 of 54 matches had to be played in the first six days of the season, but on average only 1,900 spectators were allowed into the stadiums until then. Following a decision by the Prime Ministers on 29 October, a general exclusion of spectators was finally ordered at least for match days 7 to 9. The background was the shutdown, which was initially only valid for November nationwide, but did not include the general operation of the two Bundesligen.

Teams

Team changes

Stadiums and locations
Due to the COVID-19 pandemic, only partial utilisation of the respective total capacities is permitted indefinitely, there are regional differences resulting from decisions of the respective state governments. In addition, since the 7th day of play, only ghost games may be played with the exclusion of the public.

Personnel and kits

Managerial changes

League table

Results

Relegation play-offs
The relegation play-offs took place on 27 and 30 May 2021.

All times are CEST (UTC+2).

Overview

|}

Matches

FC Ingolstadt won 4–3 on aggregate and are promoted to the 2. Bundesliga, while VfL Osnabrück are relegated to the 3. Liga.

Statistics

Top scorers

Assists

Clean sheets

Highs of the season
The highest-scoring match was FC Erzgebirge Aue's 8–3 home loss to SC Paderborn 07 on Matchday 32, when eleven goals were scored. Only in three games in the history of the second division have more than eleven goals been scored.
The highest victories were by five goals difference each:
VfL Bochum's 5–0 win against Fortuna Düsseldorf on Matchday 9;
Hamburger SV's 5–0 win against VfL Osnabrück on Matchday 16;
SC Paderborn 07's 8–3 win against FC Erzgebirge Aue on Matchday 32.
The highest-scoring draws were six goals each:
Fortuna Düsseldorf's 3–3 draw against SpVgg Greuther Fürth on Matchday 17;
FC Erzgebirge Aue's 3–3 draw against Hamburger SV on Matchday 20;
Hannover 96's 3–3 draw against Hamburger SV on Matchday 27.
The highest-scoring matchday was Matchday 32, which was also the highest-scoring matchday in second division history with 46 goals.
Serdar Dursun (SV Darmstadt 98) scored the most goals in a match in his team's 5–1 win over 1. FC Heidenheim.

Number of teams by state

Notes

References

External links

2020–21 in German football leagues
2020–21
Germany